Terrebonne is a provincial electoral district in Quebec, Canada that elects members to the National Assembly of Quebec.  It consists of most but not all of the city of Terrebonne.

It was created for the 1867 election (and an electoral district of that name existed earlier in the Legislative Assembly of the Province of Canada and the Legislative Assembly of Lower Canada).

In the change from the 2001 to the 2011 electoral map, it lost part of the city of Terrebonne to the L'Assomption electoral district.

Members of the Legislative Assembly / National Assembly

Election results

* Result compared to Action démocratique

* Result compared to UFP

References

External links
Information
 Elections Quebec

Election results
 Election results (National Assembly)
 Election results (QuébecPolitique)

Maps
 2011 map (PDF)
 2001 map (Flash)
2001–2011 changes (Flash)
1992–2001 changes (Flash)
 Electoral map of Lanaudière region
 Quebec electoral map, 2011

Terrebonne
Terrebonne, Quebec